Askaly is a village in Osh Region of Kyrgyzstan. It is part of the Alay District. Its population was 797 in 2021.

Nearby towns and villages include Terek (5 miles) and Sopu-Korgon (6 miles).

References

External links 
Satellite map at Maplandia.com

Populated places in Osh Region